Braxton Berrios (born October 6, 1995) is an American football wide receiver for the Miami Dolphins of the National Football League (NFL). He played college football at Miami (FL). He was a star athlete at Leesville Road High School in Raleigh, North Carolina where he played quarterback. He was drafted by the New England Patriots in the sixth round of the 2018 NFL Draft.

College career
Berrios is from Leesville Road, Raleigh, North Carolina. A four-star wide receiver, he committed to Miami over Ohio State, Clemson, Oregon and many other Power 5 schools. Berrios played as a true freshman, finishing the season with 21 catches for 232 yards and 3 touchdowns. In 2017, Berrios caught two touchdown passes against Florida State to help beat the Seminoles for the first time since 2009.

College statistics

Professional career

New England Patriots
Berrios was drafted by the New England Patriots in the sixth round with the 210th overall pick in the 2018 NFL Draft. On September 1, 2018, Berrios was placed on injured reserve. Berrios won a Super Bowl ring when the Patriots reached Super Bowl LIII and beat the Los Angeles Rams by a score of 13–3. He was waived during final roster cuts on August 30, 2019.

New York Jets
On September 1, 2019, Berrios was claimed off waivers by the New York Jets. In his second season with the Jets, on September 20, 2020, Berrios scored his first career touchdown off of a 30-yard pass from Sam Darnold in a 31–13 loss to the San Francisco 49ers.

In Week 16 of the 2020 season against the Cleveland Browns, Berrios caught a 43-yard touchdown pass from fellow wide receiver Jamison Crowder on a trick play during the 23–16 win.

In Week 7 of the 2021 season against the Cincinnati Bengals he recorded a receiving touchdown. In Week 16 against the Jacksonville Jaguars, Berrios returned a kickoff for a touchdown in a 26–21 win, earning AFC Special Teams Player of the Week. In Week 17, he caught a touchdown and ran for another, becoming the first Jets receiver to do so in the same game. Berrios finished second on the team with 46 catches for 431 yards and two touchdowns, plus another 40 yards and two scores rushing. He was awarded first-team All-Pro honors as a kick returner.  Berrios finished the season ranked third in the NFL in kickoff return yards (852) and third in yards per punt return (13.4).

On March 14, 2022, Berrios re-signed with the Jets on a two-year $12 million contract.

On March 9, 2023, Berrios was released by the Jets.

Miami Dolphins
On March 16, 2023, Berrios signed a one-year contract with the Miami Dolphins.

NFL career statistics

Personal life 

Braxton of Cuban descent, has been dating Sophia Culpo, sister of former Miss Universe 2012 Olivia Culpo, since late 2020. They split in 2023.

References

External links
 New York Jets bio
 Miami Hurricanes bio

1995 births
Living people
American football wide receivers
Miami Dolphins players
Miami Hurricanes football players
New England Patriots players
New York Jets players
Players of American football from Raleigh, North Carolina